This is a list of seasons completed by  Mora IK whilst competing in the HockeyAllsvenskan and the Swedish Hockey League.

References

Mora